Veigar Páll Gunnarsson (born 21 March 1980) is a retired Icelandic football striker.

His transfer in 2011 led to football clubs Stabæk and Vålerenga being nominated for fines of Norwegian kroner 500,000 and 350,000 respectively, by a committee (påtalenemd) of Football Association of Norway — and a police investigation that saw two persons arrested.

Club career

Early years
Veigar Páll made his debut for Stjarnan in the 1996 season, in which he only managed one=1 game as a substitute. He established himself as a regular in the side and started scoring goals, catching the eye of foreign teams. He then went abroad to Norway, where he played for Strømsgodset. He failed to establish himself in the first team so he returned to Iceland to play for KR Reykjavík. He quickly became popular with the fans and was the star player of the KR team that won the Icelandic Premier League in 2002 and 2003. In September 2003 he had a trial with Bolton Wanderers of the English Premier League.

Stabæk
Veigar joined Stabæk in 2004 in the season they got relegated, after being placed 3rd in the league the previous year. He flourished under new coach Jan Jönsson in 2005, with new signing Daniel Nannskog. Veigar was leading the attack with Nannskog, a partnership which was the most feared duo in the league, according to statistics (goals and assist). In the 2006 season, Nannskog became top scorer with 19 goals in Tippeligaen, the Norwegian top division, with Veigar finishing one goal behind.

In 2007, Stabæk finished second, just behind winners Brann. Veigar played well, and was the seasons assist leader with 17, and fourth on the scoring chart with 15.

The following season he made another big contribution to the club, helping them winning the league. Again he was the seasons assist leader with 14, in addition to 10 goals.

Nancy
In December 2008, he signed a contract with the  French club AS Nancy of Ligue 1.

Return to Stabæk
On 30 November 2009, Stabæk confirmed that Veigar had signed a contract with his former club. Veigar himself stated that he felt that Nancy had destroyed his career by not letting him play, but that he was looking forward to returning "home" to Stabæk.

Vålerenga
On 30 July 2011, Stabæk and Vålerenga reached an agreement, which later led to controversies. Veigar signed a contract with Vålerenga until the end of 2014.

After a spell at Stabæk, Veigar returned to his youth-club Stjarnan in 2013, and signed a four-year contract with the club.

International career
Veigar made his debut for Iceland in a January 2001 friendly match against Uruguay at the Millennium Super Soccer Cup in India. He has been capped 33 times since and has scored six goals.

Career statistics

Honours

Club
KR
Landsbankadeild: 2002, 2003

Stabæk
Tippeligaen: 2008
1. divisjon: 2005

Stjarnan
Pepsi-deild karla: 2014

See also
Veigar Páll Gunnarsson transfer 2011

References

External links

 

1980 births
Living people
Veigar Pall Gunnarsson
Veigar Pall Gunnarsson
Veigar Pall Gunnarsson
Veigar Pall Gunnarsson
Veigar Pall Gunnarsson
Strømsgodset Toppfotball players
Veigar Pall Gunnarsson
Veigar Pall Gunnarsson
Veigar Pall Gunnarsson
Stabæk Fotball players
Expatriate footballers in Norway
AS Nancy Lorraine players
Ligue 1 players
Expatriate footballers in France
Eliteserien players
Norwegian First Division players
Vålerenga Fotball players
Association football forwards
Veigar Pall Gunnarsson
Veigar Pall Gunnarsson
Veigar Pall Gunnarsson